John Gorrie is a marble sculpture depicting the American inventor and scientist of the same name by C. Adrian Pillars, installed at the United States Capitol's National Statuary Hall, in Washington, D.C., as part of the National Statuary Hall Collection. The statue was gifted by the U.S. state of Florida in 1914.

See also
 1914 in art

References

External links
 

1914 establishments in Washington, D.C.
1914 sculptures
Marble sculptures in Washington, D.C.
Monuments and memorials in Washington, D.C.
Gorrie
Sculptures of men in Washington, D.C.